In the Courtyard is a 2014 French comedy-drama film written and directed by Pierre Salvadori and starring Catherine Deneuve and Gustave Kervern. The film premiered at the 64th Berlin International Film Festival on 11 February 2014. Salvadori was awarded a Swann d'or for Best Director at the 2014 Cabourg Film Festival.

Cast 
 Catherine Deneuve as Mathilde
 Gustave Kervern as Antoine 
 Féodor Atkine as Serge
 Pio Marmaï as Stéphane
 Michèle Moretti as Colette
 Nicolas Bouchaud as M. Maillard
 Oleg Kupchik as Lev
 Carole Franck as The Councillor
 Garance Clavel as Antoine's Ex
 Olivier Charasson as Specialist
 Bruno Netter as M. Vigo

References

External links 
 
 
 

2014 films
2014 comedy-drama films
2010s French-language films
French comedy-drama films
Films directed by Pierre Salvadori
Tragicomedy films
2010s French films